Långe Jan ("Tall John") is a Swedish lighthouse located at the south cape of Öland in the Baltic Sea, Sweden's second largest island. It is one of Sweden's most famous lighthouses along with Kullen, Vinga and Landsort, and also the tallest lighthouse in Sweden.

The lighthouse was built in 1785, probably by Russian prisoners of war. The tower was built of stone from an old chapel. Originally the light was an open fire, and the tower was unpainted. It was painted white in 1845, and the same year the tower's lantern was installed, to house a colza oil lamp. A couple of years later a black band was added to the tower.

The lighthouse remains in use and is remote-controlled by the Swedish Maritime Administration in Norrköping. During the summer season, visitors may climb the tower for a small fee.

The buildings surrounding the tower form Ottenby birding station.

See also
 List of lighthouses and lightvessels in Sweden
Långe Erik ("Tall Erik"), the lighthouse at the north cape of Öland.

References

External links

 Sjofartsverket  
 The Swedish Lighthouse Society

Lighthouses completed in 1785
Towers completed in 1785
Lighthouses in Sweden
Öland
1785 establishments in Sweden